Sjøstrand is a fishing village in Viken, Norway.

Villages in Akershus